Aslauga lamborni, the Lamborn's aslauga, is a butterfly in the family Lycaenidae. It is found in Sierra Leone, Ivory Coast, Ghana, southern Nigeria, Cameroon, the Republic of the Congo, the Democratic Republic of the Congo and western Uganda. The habitat consists of primary forests.

The larvae feed on Stictococcus sjoestedti. They are associated with the ant species Crematogaster buchneri race winkleri.

Etymology
The name honours British government entomologist Dr. W.A. Lamborn, who worked in tropical Africa.

External links
Images at BOLD

References

External links
Images representing Aslauga lamborni at Barcodes of Life

Butterflies described in 1914
Aslauga